The 1995 NHK Trophy was the final event of five in the 1995–96 ISU Champions Series, a senior-level international invitational competition series. This was the inaugural year of that series. It was held in Nagoya on December 7–10. Medals were awarded in the disciplines of men's singles, ladies' singles, pair skating, and ice dancing. Skaters earned points toward qualifying for the 1995–96 Champions Series Final.

Results

Men

Ladies

Pairs

Ice dancing

External links
 1995 NHK Trophy

Nhk Trophy, 1995
NHK Trophy